Tingena afflicta is a species of moth in the family Oecophoridae. It is endemic to New Zealand.

Taxonomy 
This species was first described by Alfred Philpott in 1926 using specimens collected by himself in forest on the Dun Mountain track in November and named Borkhausenia afflicta. George Hudson discussed this species under the name B. affinis in his 1928 publication The butterflies and moths of New Zealand. In 1988 J. S. Dugdale placed this species within the genus Tingena. The male holotype is held in the New Zealand Arthropod Collection.

Description 
Philpott described the adults of this species as follows:

Distribution 
This species is endemic to New Zealand.

References

Oecophoridae
Moths of New Zealand
Moths described in 1926
Endemic fauna of New Zealand
Taxa named by Alfred Philpott
Endemic moths of New Zealand